Fainoglyphus is a genus of mites in the family Acaridae.

Species
 Fainoglyphus magnasternus Atyeo & Gaud, 1977
 Fainoglyphus ornatus S. Mahunka, 1979

References

Acaridae